Unclenching the Fists is a 2021 Russian drama film directed by Kira Kovalenko. In July 2021, the film won the Un Certain Regard award at the 2021 Cannes Film Festival. It was selected as the Russian entry for the Best International Feature Film at the 94th Academy Awards.

Plot
Ada, an Ossetian girl, plans an escape from her life in a small town of Mizur in North Ossetia, Russia.

Cast
Milana Aguzarova as Ada
Alik Karayev as Father
Soslan Khugayev as Akim

Reception
On review aggregator Rotten Tomatoes, the film holds an approval rating of 89% based on 18 reviews, with an average rating of 7.9/10. On Metacritic, the film has a weighted average score of 72 out of 100, based on 7 critics, indicating "generally favorable reviews".

Salon.coms Gary M. Kramer, praised the director's view calling it "[an] urgent, unsentimental approach [is] what makes Unclenching the Fists so potent".

Diego Semerene of Slant Magazine wrote "Unclenching the Fists is a tale of how the desolation of a nation inhabits and engraves a woman's body".

See also
List of submissions to the 94th Academy Awards for Best International Feature Film
List of Russian submissions for the Academy Award for Best International Feature Film

References

External links

2021 drama films
Russian drama films
Ossetian-language films